Vedat Okyar (August 1945 – 20 July 2009) was a Turkish international footballer who later became a sports journalist.

Early life
Vedat Okyar was born in Bursa August 1945. He played amateur football for Yücespor and Adaletspor before becoming a professional in 1965.

Career

Football career
Okyar played professionally as a midfielder for Bursaspor, Beşiktaş, Diyarbakırspor and Karagümrük. He was club captain of Beşiktaş between 1975 and 1976, and he also earned thirty-three caps for the Turkish national side.

Journalism career
After retiring as a professional footballer at age 42, Okyar became a sports journalist.

Death
Okyar died of colorectal cancer in an Istanbul hospital on 20 July 2009, aged 64. Following the religious funeral service at Teşvikiye Mosque, he was laid to rest at the Zincirlikuyu Cemetery.

Individual
Beşiktaş J.K. Squads of Century (Silver Team)

References

1945 births
Date of birth missing
2009 deaths
Sportspeople from Bursa
Turkish footballers
Turkey international footballers
Turkey under-21 international footballers
Turkey youth international footballers
Bursaspor footballers
Beşiktaş J.K. footballers
Association football midfielders
Deaths from colorectal cancer
Deaths from cancer in Turkey
Burials at Zincirlikuyu Cemetery